Irantzu García (born July 14, 1992 in Amorebieta-Etxano, Basque Country, Spain; also known as Irantzu García Vez) is a Spanish curler.

Teams

Women's

Mixed

Mixed doubles

Personal life
She is a doctor and is currently working in a hospital. 

Her brother Gontzal García Vez is also a curler. He plays together with Irantzu in mixed or mixed doubles teams.

References

External links

 

Living people
1992 births
People from Amorebieta-Etxano
Sportspeople from Biscay
Spanish female curlers
Spanish curling champions
21st-century Spanish women